KLBD 88.1 FM is a radio station licensed to Premont, Texas.  The station broadcasts a Spanish Christian music format and is owned by The Worship Center of Kingsville.

References

External links
KLBD's official website

LBD